Hannah Charlotte Hicks is a female international table tennis player from England.

Table tennis career
She represented England at three successive World Table Tennis Championships, from 2010 and 2014, in the Corbillon Cup (women's team event).

She competed in the 2010 Commonwealth Games and won a Junior English National Table Tennis Championships title. Her coach is Nicky Jarvis.

See also
 List of England players at the World Team Table Tennis Championships

References

English female table tennis players
Living people
1991 births
Table tennis players at the 2010 Commonwealth Games
Commonwealth Games competitors for England